Crusade is a novel written by Elizabeth Laird and first published by Macmillan in 2007. It is set in the Third Crusade and focuses on a Saracen boy named Salim and an English boy called Adam. It was shortlisted for the 2007 Costa Children's Book Award..

Plot 

For a year, Acre is besieged by the Frankish army, while the Sultan's camp is close by. In an incredible twist of fate, Jennet's ship reappears and she arrives to Adam with baby Tibby, the daughter of Robert de Martel. By chance, Adam and Faithful stumble across Salim, who was watching Acre in a spell of homesickness. Adam becomes a serf for Sir Ivo, and works as a groom and later becomes a squire.

Salim takes to watching the Frankish camp as often as possible until he gets caught by Saracen soldiers who believe him to be a spy for the franks, however when they return with him to Saladin's camp his identity is discovered. When Saladin realises how much information Salim has learned about the Frankish army, he is told to continue to watch them as long as he doesn't get caught. The Mamluk Ismail uses Salim's information to plan an ambush on the soldiers nearest the edge of the camp.

The Mamluks provoke the Martel soldiers by yelling insults while on horses. The knights immediately prepare for battle, eager to leave the camp. Sir Guy de Martel ignores advice from Sir Ivo, who believes they are going to ride straight into an ambush. All of the knights from the Martel army ride to battle, swiftly followed by their squires and other foot soldiers. Adam runs to Sir Ivo's help and Faithful tries to follow but gets ordered to return to the camp. However, Adam doesn't see Faithful start running with him again, instead of returning to the camp. When they arrive to the ambush, the knights are already fighting the Mamluks. Two Mamluks are attacking Sir Ivo, one of them is trying to make his horse, Grimbald, rear while the other is trying to attack him with a sword. Faithful bites the Mamluk trying to make Grimbald rear, which later turns out to be Ismail, while Sir Ivo kills the other. The Mamluks retreat with four Frankish prisoners of war. Faithful starts barking at Sir Guy de Martel's horse, Vigor, and Adam hurriedly pulls him away and sends him back to the camp. When he turns back he discovers Vigor has reared and Guy de Martel has fallen to the ground.

In an act of chivalry, Saladin sends Dr. Musa and Salim to try to heal Sir Guy, who has a serious head injury and remains unconscious. One of the prisoners is sent with him with the threat that if he failed to return, or if he allowed Dr. Musa and Salim to be harmed, the other prisoners would be killed. Dr. Musa meets Dr. John, a Frankish doctor who lived all his life in the Holy Land, and Dr. Nicholas. Unlike Dr. John, Nicholas believes a demon has entered Sir Guy's body and that's why he remains unconscious, and the only way to save him is to let the demon from his body. Dr. John and Musa know he has no demon on his body and they eventually win the right to treat Sir Guy instead of Nicholas.

They manage to repair the damage and, although Sir Guy survives, he isn't returned completely to normal. For a while, he only remained conscious for a small amount of time each day. It was in one of these brief moments that he told Adam he was really his father. Sir Robert de Martel refuses to believe he is related to Adam and believes Adam is a witch and has put a spell on Sir Guy. Eventually he is forced to accept it. A little while after the accident, Adam leaves morning mass early to talk to his father and admits it was his dog who caused Vigor to rear and Sir Guy sees it as punishment for his sins. Just a few days after Adam admits this, Sir Guy has a seizure and while Dr. John is in a different part of the army Dr. Nicholas, still certain a demon has entered Sir Guy's body and caused the fit, is left to do what he thinks will help. He cuts open Sir Guy's head to release the demon and Sir Guy dies rapidly. When Dr. Musa hears of the death he is furious at Dr. Nicholas' decision..

Sir Ivo and Adam are grateful that Dr. Musa came to help Sir Guy, and they travel to the Saracen camp to ask them if there was anything they could do for them. Dr. Musa mentions that Salim's family is still in the castle of Acre and asks for a safe passage for them through the camp. Sir Ivo does as they asked but Ali, a part of the garrison of Acre, chooses to remain in the castle to help defend Acre against the Frankish army. When back in Saladin's camp, Salim's mother reveals her plans to go to Damascus where her brother lives, using money a friend gave her just before she left. Just days after the family escaped, Acre's walls fall and the army attacks the city..

While waiting for the walls to finally fall, Adam and the rest of the army prepare to go inside siege towers. Jennet is nearby, handing out water to the stifling soldiers. While they are all waiting for the attack, one of the towers is hit by Greek Fire. Adam and the rest of the soldiers hurriedly got away from the tower before they were harmed, but it fell on Jennet and she quickly died. Adam helps in the attack when the walls finally fall, but he is hit by an object while climbing over the remnants of the crumbled wall. He is carried back to safety by Sir Ivo. He later wakes up in Acre's hospital but it is a few weeks before he is strong enough to leave the hospital. Here he discovers a woman called Joan is looking after since Jennet's death. He offers to pay her enough to leave her job and go to his own new estate, to which she agrees.

A little while after this, Tibby goes missing and Adam searches for her everywhere, only to discover Jacques has sold her to slavers. Salim, Dr. Musa and their body guard and groom, Tewfik are told they can finally travel to Jerusalem. While they are leaving, Adam finds them and convinces them to help find Tibby. They give Adam a skullcap and Damascus tunic to help him pass as a Kurd while travelling to find the slavers in Jerusalem. He is told to pretend to be deaf and dumb so no one realises he is really a Frank. They never reach Jerusalem but they find Tibby and Adam narrowly escapes with her. When he returns he is jailed for abandoning Sir Ivo, who was badly wounded in his absence. Eventually, he is released and allowed to return to England. While waiting to board the ship, Adam tells everyone that Jacques is a cheat and he starts to chase Jacques along with several more people. He is then found by a messenger who gives him is bond of freedom to go to his new estate at Brockwood..

At Dr. Musa's home in Jerusalem, a group of Mamluks including Ismail appear and say Saladin wants them to return. Dr. Musa refuses to return to the army, but tells the Mamluks Salim knows just as much as he does. Salim, who longs to return to the army, is given a turban by Dr. Musa which prompts Ismail to call him brother instead of little brother. With the Mamluks, Salim rides back to Saladin's army.

Ten years on, Adam is the master of Brockwood, he manages his estate well with Tom Bate (Jennet's father), as his right-hand man, and he married a miller's daughter, who is called Margaret. They have three sons and Faithful has puppies. Sir Ivo is a frequent visitor. Adam never finds out Dr. Musa died quietly five years after Saladin saved Jerusalem, while reading a book in the courtyard of his home. Salim cried when he heard the news, and after years of training he is a well-respected doctor. He looks after his family and lives in a house in Damascus with his wife, Leila and two daughters. He keeps a Mamluk-trained horse in his stable and sometimes saddles it up for a ride to be on his own. Ismail is captain of his own Mamluk troop and often sends Salim greetings and news.

Characters

Salim 
Salim Ibn Adil is a boy from the mighty town of Acre. When news that a Frankish army is arriving soon sweeps through the town, his father makes him leave as Dr. Musa's apprentice to get to safety in Damascus. While they are escaping, a small unit of Franks forces them to hide by a farmstead's outer wall at the top of a hill. They are almost discovered by the Franks when a small force of Mamluks appears and chases the Franks away without seeing Salim, Dr. Musa and their mule Suweida. They try to keep hidden while the Mamluks are there but Suweida gives away their position. The Mamluks take them to Sultan Saladin's camp as they are in need of a doctor. Here, Salim befriends a Mamluk named Ismail.

Adam 
Adam is a fourteen-year-old English boy. After his mother dies, he becomes convinced that the only way to guarantee her soul to Paradise is to scatter the dust of Jerusalem on her grave. Jacques the pedlar sells him some of this special soil but, after Adam spent his only penny on the bottle of soil, he discovers it is ordinary dirt from England. After his mother's death, he becomes a dog boy in service of the lord guy. When war is announced, Adam is inspired to take up the cross and travel to the Holy Land to obtain the dust of Jerusalem for his mother. The Lord selects him as one of the people to travel to the Holy Land, hoping for some good hunting on the way there. Before they leave for the Holy Land, Adam is given a mastiff he then names Faithful. During their trip, most of the dogs die of illness while Faithful is the only one remaining by the time they arrive at Acre. His closest friend, named Jennet, is on a separate ship to him and to Adam's horror; the ship is lost during a terrible storm.

References

2007 British novels
2007 children's books
British children's novels
British historical novels
Children's historical novels
Novels set during the Crusades
Macmillan Publishers books